The centre wavelength is the power-weighted mean wavelength:

And the total power is:

where  is the power spectral density, for example in W/nm.

The above integrals theoretically extend over the entire spectrum, however it is usually sufficient to perform the integral over the spectrum where the spectral density  is higher than a fraction of its maximum.

See also
 peak wavelength
 dominant wavelength

Waves